Big beat is an electronic music genre that usually uses heavy breakbeats and synthesizer-generated loops and patterns –  common to acid house/techno. The term has been used by the British music industry to describe music by artists such as the Prodigy, the Chemical Brothers, Fatboy Slim, the Crystal Method, Propellerheads, Basement Jaxx and Groove Armada.

Big beat achieved mainstream success during the 1990s, and achieved its critical and commercial peak between 1995 and 1999, with releases such the Chemical Brothers’ Dig Your Own Hole, Prodigy’s Fat of the Land, and Fatboy Slim’s You've Come a Long Way, Baby, before quickly declining from 2000 onwards.

Style
Big beat features heavy and distorted drum beats at tempos between 100 and 140 beats per minute, Roland TB-303 synthesizer lines resembling those of acid house, and heavy loops from 1960s and 1970s funk, soul, jazz, and rock songs. They are often punctuated with punk-style vocals or rappers and driven by intense, distorted synthesizer basslines with conventional pop, house and techno song structures. Big beat tracks have a sound that includes crescendos, builds, drops, extended drum rolls, and sounds such as spoken word samples, dialogues from film and TV, additional instruments such as Middle Eastern strings or sitars, explosions, air horns, sirens (usually police sirens) and gunshots. As with several other dance genres at the time, the use of effects such as filters, phasing, and flanging was common in the genre.

Celebrated pioneers of the genre such as Fatboy Slim tend to feature heavily compressed loud breakbeats in their songs, which are used to define the music as much as any melodic hooks and sampled sounds. Based on the primary use of loud, heavy breakbeats and basslines, big beat shares attributes with jungle and drum and bass, but has a significantly slower tempo.

History

Earlier uses of the term

The term "big beat" traces its roots to the Eastern Bloc in the 1960s. Unlike the 1990s genre, it did not cover electronic music; rather, it was used to cover rock and roll and its related genres as the terms were not approved by the authorities in the Eastern Bloc countries (the USSR and its satellite states in the Warsaw Pact). By the 1980s, rock and roll and related terms were already accepted by the authorities, so the term fell into obscurity until its 1990s name revival.

Premise (late 1980s)

In 1989, Iain Williams from the English electronic duo Big Bang coined the musical term "big beat" to describe the band's musical style. Williams explained the concept during an interview with the journalist Alex Gerry in an article published in the London magazine Metropolitan (issue 132, page 9, 6 June 1989) under the heading, Big Bang in Clubland – Could Big Beat be the 1989 answer to Acid House? The band was promoting their first record, an Arabic-inspired dance version of ABBA's  "Voulez-Vous" and their instrumental track "Cold Nights in Cairo" that had just been released on Swanyard Records. The single was produced by Big Bang and Steev Toth. Big Bang are Laurence Malice (Trade nightclub founder) and Iain Williams (writer). The band's sound consisted of various experimental musical elements, including heavy drum beats and synthesizer-generated loops as well as an added suggestion of European influences that at times had a trance-like quality. The band used session vocalists on all their recordings. The concept of the big beat sound was later picked up on and adapted by many club DJs and went on to become widely used by many successful musicians throughout the 1990s.

Emerging (early 1990s)

In the early 1990s, in the midst of several popular musical subcultures, including the English rave scene, British hip hop, chillout or ambient, gestating subgenres such as trip hop and breakbeat, along with the emerging Britpop movement – a process of hybridisation and a taste for eclecticism was developing within English dance music generally. Early purveyors of this approach include influential artists such as the Orb, Depth Charge, Meat Beat Manifesto, Transglobal Underground, and Andrew Weatherall's Sabres of Paradise.

Sampling had become an integral part of dance music production and the fusion of genres appealed to DJs, producers, and fans keen on continued experimentalism within dance music. Record labels such as Junior Boy's Own and Heavenly Records demonstrated this broader-minded approach, releasing slower breakbeat-based music alongside house and acid house singles, introducing DJ-turned-artists such as the Chemical Brothers (known then as the Dust Brothers) and Monkey Mafia in 1994. Norman Cook and Damian Harris first became associated with the term "big beat" through Harris's label Skint Records and club night the Big Beat Boutique, held on Friday nights at Brighton's Concorde club between 1995 and 2001. The Heavenly label's London club The Sunday Social had adopted a similar philosophy with resident DJs the Chemical Brothers and their eclectic approach. The term caught on, and was subsequently applied to a wide variety of acts, including Bentley Rhythm Ace, Lionrock, the Crystal Method, Lunatic Calm, the Lo Fidelity Allstars, Death in Vegas, and the Propellerheads among others.

Mainstream success (1990s-early 2000s)
Big beat achieved mainstream success in the 1990s and early 2000s. During the 1990s, the Prodigy had several songs in the top ten of the UK Singles Chart and two of those songs went to number 1 on the chart. The Prodigy also had a lot of popularity in the United States during the 1990s. The Prodigy's album The Fat of the Land went to number 1 on the Billboard 200 in July 1997. The Prodigy performed at the 1997 MTV Video Music Awards won the Viewer's Choice Award there. The Prodigy's song "Firestarter" went to number 30 on the Billboard Hot 100. The Prodigy's song "Smack My Bitch Up" went to number 89 on the Billboard Hot 100. The Fat of the Land by the Prodigy sold 2,600,000 copies in the United States and was certified 2× platinum by the Recording Industry Association of America (RIAA). The Prodigy's single "Firestarter" was certified gold by the RIAA. Fatboy Slim also achieved mainstream success in the 1990s. His 1998 album You've Come a Long Way, Baby was certified platinum in September 1999. Fatboy Slim's song "Praise You" peaked at number 36 on the Billboard Hot 100 on May 22, 1999, and his song "The Rockafeller Skank" peaked at number 76 on the Billboard Hot 100 on January 15, 2000. "Praise You" and "The Rockafeller Skank" peaked at number 22 on the Mainstream Top 40 chart in 1999 and number 21 on the Mainstream Top 40 chart in 1999, respectively. In August 1998, the Crystal Method's song "Comin' Back" went to number 1 on the Dance Club Songs chart. The Chemical Brothers' album Dig Your Own Hole was released in April 1997 and was certified gold by the RIAA on September 10, 1997. The album sold 756,000 copies in the United States. The Chemical Brothers' song "Setting Sun" peaked at number 80 on the Billboard Hot 100 on February 1, 1997. The mainstream success of the Chemical Brothers helped their 1995 album Exit Planet Dust and 1999 album Surrender sell 331,000 copies in the United States and 402,000 copies in the United States, respectively. The soundtrack to the 1999 movie The Matrix included big beat songs and the soundtrack was certified platinum by the RIAA on August 25, 1999. The soundtrack sold 1,460,000 copies in the United States, according to Nielsen SoundScan.

Decline (2001–present)

The big beat scene had started to gradually decline in popularity by 2001, due to the novelty of the genre's formula fading. The genre's most successful acts would alter their sound further, more prominently, the Chemical Brothers releasing more material with direct house and techno characteristics (including "4x4" beats which resemble those of house and synthesizer sweeps and noises, marking a departure from their big beat sound consisting of syncopated breakbeats and hip hop samples) inspired by the success of the Gatecrasher club and the trance movement, which would reach a commercial peak between 1999 and 2002. However, big beat had left an indelible mark on popular music as an indigenous progression from rave music, bridging a divide between clubbers and indie rock fans. Without this connection, some have reasoned that it would not have reached the heights that it did, or resonated with as many listeners as it did.

References

Further reading
 The Little Big Beat Book by Rory Hoy, published 10/09/2018, by New Haven Publishing Ltd,  - The book outlines the history of Big Beat as a musical genre and contains 120 interviews with bands and musicians that helped create and produce Big Beat music.
 The Story of Big Beat: Bookazine Paperback – 30 Jul 2019 by Rory Hoy, New Haven Publishing Ltd (30 July 2019),

External links
 

 
Electronic dance music genres
English styles of music
Breakbeat genres
1990s in music